The question of whether Jesus historically existed is part of the study undertaken in the quest for the historical Jesus and the scholarly reconstructions of his life. Virtually all scholars of antiquity accept that Jesus was a historical figure and dismiss denials of his existence as a fringe theory, while many details like his alleged miracles and theological significance are subject to debate.

Standard historical criteria have aided in evaluating the historicity of the gospel narratives, and only two key events are almost universally accepted, namely that Jesus was baptized by John the Baptist and crucified by order of the Roman prefect Pontius Pilate.

Besides the gospels, sources for the historicity of Jesus include Roman historians Josephus and Tacitus, who lived shortly after the time of Jesus and referenced him and his followers in their histories.

Historical existence

The quest for the historical Jesus and the scholarly reconstructions of the life of Jesus are based primarily on critical analysis of the gospel texts and applying the standard criteria of historical-critical investigation, and methodologies for analyzing the reliability of primary sources and other historical evidence.

Virtually all scholars of antiquity agree that a historical human Jesus existed. Historian Michael Grant asserts that if conventional standards of historical textual criticism are applied to the New Testament, "we can no more reject Jesus' existence than we can reject the existence of a mass of pagan personages whose reality as historical figures is never questioned."

Christ myth theory

The Christ myth theory, which developed within the scholarly research on the historical Jesus, is, in Geoffrey W. Bromiley's words, the view that "the story of Jesus is a piece of mythology" possessing no "substantial claims to historical fact". Alternatively, Bart Ehrman (who himself rejects the Christ myth theory) summarises Earl Doherty's view as being "that no historical Jesus worthy of the name existed, that Christianity began with a belief in a spiritual, mythical figure, that the Gospels are essentially allegory and fiction, and that no single identifiable person lay at the root of the Galilean preaching tradition".  

Virtually all scholars of antiquity dismiss theories of Jesus's non-existence or regard them as refuted. In modern scholarship, the Christ myth theory is a fringe theory and finds virtually no support from scholars.

Sources

Some scholars estimate that there are about 30 surviving independent sources written by 25 authors who attest to Jesus. The New Testament represents sources that have become canonical for Christianity, and there are many apocryphal texts that are examples of the wide variety of writings in the first centuries AD that are related to Jesus. There are also numerous Jewish and Roman sources (e.g. Josephus, Suetonius, Tacitus, Pliny the Younger, and rabbinic tradition) that talk about Jesus. On the quality of extant sources, Hans-Joachim Schoeps argues that they intertwine history and legend and present the views of the early disciples and the Christian community. According to Christopher M. Tuckett, most available sources are collections of early traditions about Jesus. According to Maurice Casey, some of the sources, such as parts of the Gospel of Mark, are translations of early Aramaic sources which indicate proximity with eyewitness testimony.

Historiographical approaches associated with the study of the poor in the past, such as microhistory, can help assess what type of sources can be reasonably expected in the historical record for individuals like Jesus. For instance, Justin Meggitt argues that since most people in antiquity left no sign of their existence, especially the poor, it is unreasonable to expect non-Christian sources to corroborate the specific existence of someone with Jesus's socio-economic status. Ehrman argues that the historical record for the first century was so lacking that no contemporary eyewitness reports for prominent individuals such as Pontius Pilate or Josephus survive. Historian Michael Grant argues that when the New Testament is analyzed with the same criteria used by historians on ancient writings that contain historical material, Jesus' existence cannot be denied anymore than secular figures whose existence is never questioned.

New Testament sources

Synoptic Gospels

The synoptic gospels are the primary sources of historical information about Jesus and of the religious movement he founded. The Gospels of Matthew, Mark, and Luke recount the life, ministry, crucifixion and resurrection of a Jew named Jesus who spoke Aramaic. There are different hypotheses regarding the origin of the texts because the gospels of the New Testament were written in Greek for Greek-speaking communities, and were later translated into Syriac, Latin, and Coptic. Scholars argue that the surviving gospels show usage of earlier independent written and oral sources that extended back to the time of Jesus's death, but did not survive. Aramaic sources have been detected in Mark's Gospel, which indicate use of early or even eyewitness testimony when it was being written. Historians often study the historical reliability of the Acts of the Apostles when studying the reliability of the gospels, as the Book of Acts was seemingly written by the same author as the Gospel of Luke.

Pauline epistles
The seven Pauline epistles considered by scholarly consensus to be genuine are dated to between AD 50 and 60 (i.e., approximately 20 to 30 years after the generally accepted time period of Jesus's death) and are the earliest surviving Christian texts that may include information about Jesus. Although Paul the Apostle provides relatively little biographical information about Jesus and states that he never knew Jesus personally, he does make it clear that he considers Jesus to have been a real person and a Jew. Moreover, he interacted with eyewitnesses of Jesus since he wrote about meeting and knowing James, the brother of Jesus and Jesus's apostles Peter and John.

Non-Christian sources

Josephus and Tacitus

Non-Christian sources used to study and establish the historicity of Jesus include the  first century Jewish historian Josephus and Roman historian Tacitus. These sources are compared to Christian sources, such as the Pauline letters and synoptic gospels, and are usually independent of each other; that is, the Jewish sources do not draw upon the Roman sources. Similarities and differences between these sources are used in the authentication process.

In Books 18 and 20 of Antiquities of the Jews, written around AD 93 to 94, Josephus twice refers to the biblical Jesus. The general scholarly view holds that the longer passage, known as the Testimonium Flavianum, most likely consists of an authentic nucleus that was subjected to later Christian interpolation or forgery. On the other hand, Josephus scholar Louis H. Feldman states that "few have doubted the genuineness" of the reference found in Antiquities 20, 9, 1 to "the brother of Jesus, who was called Christ, whose name was James".

Tacitus, in his Annals (written  AD 115), book 15, chapter 44, describes Nero's scapegoating of the Christians following the Fire of Rome. He writes that the founder of the sect was named Christus (the Christian title for Jesus); that he was executed under Pontius Pilate; and that the movement, initially checked, broke out again in Judea and even in Rome itself. The scholarly consensus is that Tacitus' reference to the execution of Jesus by Pilate is both authentic and of historical value as an independent Roman source.

Mishnah
The Mishnah ( 200) may refer to Jesus as it reflects the early Jewish traditions of portraying Jesus as a sorcerer or magician. Other references to Jesus and his execution exist in the Talmud, but they aim to discredit his actions, not deny his existence.

Historical Jesus

Baptism and crucifixion
The only two events subject to "almost universal assent" are that Jesus was baptized by John the Baptist and was crucified by order of the Roman Prefect Pontius Pilate.

According to New Testament scholar James Dunn, nearly all modern scholars consider the baptism of Jesus and his crucifixion to be historically certain. He states that these "two facts in the life of Jesus command almost universal assent" and "rank so high on the 'almost impossible to doubt or deny' scale of historical 'facts' they are obvious starting points for an attempt to clarify the what and why of Jesus' mission." John P. Meier views the crucifixion of Jesus as historical fact and states that based on the criterion of embarrassment Christians would not have invented the painful death of their leader.
The criterion of embarrassment is also used to argue in favor of the historicity of the baptism of Jesus by John the Baptist as it is a story which the early Christian Church would have never wanted to invent. Based on this criterion, given that John baptised for the remission of sins, and Jesus was viewed as without sin, the invention of this story would have served no purpose, and would have been an embarrassment given that it positioned John above Jesus.

Amy-Jill Levine has summarized the situation by stating that "there is a consensus of sorts on the basic outline of Jesus' life" in that most scholars agree that Jesus was baptized by John the Baptist, and over a period of one to three years debated Jewish authorities on the subject of God, gathered followers, and was crucified by Roman prefect Pontius Pilate who officiated 26–36 AD.

General biographical elements
There is much in dispute as to his previous life, childhood, family and place of residence, of which the canonical gospels are almost completely silent.

Scholars attribute varying levels of certainty to other episodes. E. P. Sanders proposed eight "indisputable facts" about Jesus's life as a framework for biographical discussion:
 Jesus was a Galilean preacher.
 His activities took place in Galilee and Judea.
 He was baptized by John the Baptist.
 He called disciples.
 He had a controversy at the Temple.
 Jesus was crucified by the Romans near Jerusalem.
 After his death his disciples continued.
 Some of his disciples were persecuted.

Scholarly agreement on this extended list is not universal. Elements whose historical authenticity are disputed include the two accounts of the nativity of Jesus; the miracles, such as turning water into wine, feeding the multitude, walking on water, and various cures, exorcisms, and resurrections; his own resurrection; and certain details about his crucifixion.

Quest for the historical Jesus
Since the 18th century, three separate scholarly quests for the historical Jesus have taken place, each with distinct characteristics and based on different research criteria, which were often developed during that phase. Currently modern scholarly research on the historical Jesus focuses on what is historically probable, or plausible about Jesus.

Portraits of the historical Jesus

The portraits of Jesus constructed in the quests have often differed from each other, and from the image portrayed in the gospel accounts. There are overlapping attributes among the portraits, and while pairs of scholars may agree on some attributes, those same scholars may differ on others, and there is no single portrait of the historical Jesus that satisfies most scholars. The mainstream profiles in the third quest may be grouped together based on their primary themes of apocalyptic prophet, charismatic healer, Cynic philosopher, Jewish Messiah, and prophet of social change—but there is little scholarly agreement on a single portrait or the methods needed to construct it, especially in the 21st century. Ehrman elucidates these differences by pointing out that there are essentialy two different portraits of Jesus, one for the preacher who really existed, and the other for the Jesus most Christians believe in today. There are, however, overlapping attributes among the portraits, and scholars who differ on some attributes may agree on others.

See also
 Chronology of Jesus
 Historical background of the New Testament
 Historicity of Muhammad
 Historicity of the Bible
 Jesus and history (disambiguation)
 Jesus in comparative mythology
 Jesus in the Talmud
 Jesus Seminar
 Mara bar Serapion on Jesus
 
 Psilanthropism
 Suetonius on Christians

Notes

References

Sources

 
 Boyarin, Daniel (2004). Border Lines. The Partition of Judaeo-Christianity. University of Pennsylvania Press.
 
 

 
 

 Doherty, Earl (1999). The Jesus Puzzle. Did Christianity Begin with a Mythical Christ? : Challenging the Existence of an Historical Jesus. 
 Drews, Arthur & Burns, C. Deslisle (1998). The Christ Myth (Westminster College–Oxford Classics in the Study of Religion). 
 
 

 
 
 

 
 France, R.T. (2001). The Evidence for Jesus. Hodder & Stoughton.

 George, Augustin & Grelot, Pierre (Eds.) (1992). Introducción Crítica al Nuevo Testamento. Herder. 
 Gowler, David B. (2007). What Are They Saying About the Historical Jesus?. Paulist Press.
 

 
 

 

 Meier, John P., A Marginal Jew: Rethinking the Historical Jesus, Anchor Bible Reference Library, Doubleday
 (1991), v. 1, The Roots of the Problem and the Person, 
 (1994), v. 2, Mentor, Message, and Miracles, 
 (2001), v. 3, Companions and Competitors, 
 (2009), v. 4, Law and Love, 
 Mendenhall, George E. (2001). Ancient Israel's Faith and History: An Introduction to the Bible in Context. 
 Messori, Vittorio (1977). Jesus hypotheses. St Paul Publications. 
 New Oxford Annotated Bible with the Apocrypha, New Revised Standard Version. (1991) New York, Oxford University Press. 

 
 
 

 

 

 
 

 Wells, George A. (1988). The Historical Evidence for Jesus. Prometheus Books. 
 Wells, George A. (1998). The Jesus Myth. 
 Wells, George A. (2004). Can We Trust the New Testament?: Thoughts on the Reliability of Early Christian Testimony. 
 
 Wilson, Ian (2000). Jesus: The Evidence (1st ed.). Regnery Publishing.

External links

 
 
Christ myth theory
Jesus
Historical controversies
Historicity of the Bible